Høeg is a surname, and may refer to: 

Carsten Høeg, Danish academic
Kaare Høeg, Norwegian engineer
Marie Høeg (1866-1949), Norwegian photographer and suffragist
Ove Arbo Høeg, Norwegian botanist
Peter Høeg, Danish writer